The Faith School District is a public school district in Meade County, based in Faith, South Dakota.

Schools
The Faith School District has two elementary schools, one middle school, and one high school.

Elementary schools
Faith Elementary School
Maurine Elementary School

Middle school
Faith Middle School

High school
Faith High School

References

External links

School districts in South Dakota